Alden School District may refer to:
 Alden Community School District - Iowa
 Alden Central School District - New York